Myers Creek is a  long 2nd order tributary to the Banister River in Halifax County, Virginia.

Course 
Myers Creek rises at Loves Shop, Virginia in Halifax County and then flows northeast and east to join the Banister River about 4 miles northeast of South Boston.

Watershed 
Myers Creek drains  of area, receives about 45.6 in/year of precipitation, has a wetness index of 395.59, and is about 55% forested.

See also 
 List of Virginia Rivers

References 

Rivers of Halifax County, Virginia
Rivers of Virginia